Hakuna Matata Restaurant is a restaurant located in Adventureland in Disneyland Paris. It is themed to the movie The Lion King.

Aux Epices Enchantées
Originally, when the park opened in 1992, the restaurant was known as Aux Epices Enchantées (With Enchanted Spices). It is the main building of the African part of Adventureland and features many African artifacts in the setting of a peaceful jungle. Its original meals, however, could be inspired by Africa, Asia or the West Indies.

Hakuna Matata Restaurant
With the release of the movie The Lion King in 1994, the perfect theme came through to link the restaurant to the Disney universe. As such, it was renamed Hakuna Matata Restaurant in March 1994. The building itself remains unaltered though, except for murals of the characters Timon and Pumbaa which were added later.

External links
 Photos Magiques - Restaurant Hakuna Matata

References

The Lion King in amusement parks
Hakuna Matata Restaurant
Adventureland (Disney)
1992 establishments in France
Restaurants established in 1992